Gustavo Martínez (2 July 1932 – 19 August 2006) was a Guatemalan cyclist. He competed in the men's sprint and 1,000 metres time trial events at the 1952 Summer Olympics in Helsinki. He finished 26th and 24th respectively, in a field of 27.

References

External links
 

1932 births
2006 deaths
Guatemalan male cyclists
Olympic cyclists of Guatemala
Cyclists at the 1952 Summer Olympics